The 2017–18 Cornell Big Red women's basketball team represents Cornell University during the 2017–18 NCAA Division I women's basketball season. The Big Red, led by sixteenth year head coach Dayna Smith, play their home games at Newman Arena and were members of the Ivy League. They finished the season 7–20, 3–11 in Ivy League play to finish in a tie for sixth place. They failed to qualify for the Ivy women's tournament.

Previous season
They finished the season 16–11, 7–7 in Ivy League play to finish in a tie for fourth place.

Roster

Schedule

|-
!colspan=9 style=| Non-conference regular season

|-
!colspan=9 style=| Ivy League regular season

See also
 2017–18 Cornell Big Red men's basketball team

References

Cornell Big Red women's basketball seasons
Cornell
Cornell Big Red women's
Cornell Big Red women's